Kampong Batu Marang is a village within Mukim Mentiri in Brunei-Muara District, Brunei. The population was 870 in 2016.

Geography 
Kampong Batu Marang is located in the northeastern part of the district. As a village subdivision, it borders Kampong Salar to the north, the Brunei Bay to the east, RPN Kampong Mentiri to the south, Kampong Mentiri to the southwest and Kampong Sungai Buloh to the west. The actual populated area only exists as a small cluster of stilted dwellings on the banks near the mouth of Mentiri River, a small river which flows into the Brunei Bay, and surrounded by dense vegetation. It is only accessible by land from Kampong Sungai Buloh.

Facilities

School 
 Batu Marang Primary School

Mosque 
Kampong Batu Marang Mosque is the village mosque and was opened for use on 19 January 1996. It can accommodate 1,000 worshippers. The mosque celebrated its silver jubilee anniversary of its establishment in 2021.

See also 
 Kampong Ayer

References 

Batu Marang